Vachonisia is a Devonian marrellomorph known from the Lower Devonian Hunsrück Slate.  It grows in a similar fashion to the other Hunsruck marrellomorph, Mimetaster, and is closely related to the Silurian Xylokorys.  It is known from 20 specimens; its whole body is covered by a shield-like carapace.

References

Devonian animals
Prehistoric arthropod genera
Fossils of Germany
Hunsrück Slate fossils
Marrellomorpha